Mount Augusta is a peak  east of Mount Wild, at the south end of the Queen Alexandra Range in Antarctica. It was discovered by the British Antarctic Expedition (1907–09) and named for Augusta Edwards, a relative of Ernest Shackleton and the wife of Swinford Edwards.

See also
Skaar Ridge

References
 

Mountains of the Ross Dependency
Shackleton Coast